The 1898 ICA Track Cycling World Championships were the World Championship for track cycling. They took place in Vienna, Austria from 8 to 12 September 1898. Four events for men were contested, two for professionals and two for amateurs.

Medal summary

Medal table

References

UCI Track Cycling World Championships by year
International cycle races hosted by Austria
Sports competitions in Vienna
ICA Track Cycling World Championships
ICA Track Cycling World Championships
1890s in Vienna
1898 in Austrian sport